The Ninth Australian Recording Industry Association Music Awards (generally known as the ARIA Music Awards or simply The ARIAS) was held on 20 October 1995 at the Sydney Convention & Exhibition Centre. There had been a 18-month gap since the previous award ceremony which was moved to be "closer to the business end of the music industry's year" and so reflect that year's works. Presenters distributed 28 awards from 1060 eligible submissions. Big winners for the year were Silverchair with five awards and Tina Arena with four, including Album of the Year and Song of the Year – both first time they were won by a female.

In addition to previous categories, the former category Best Pop/Dance Release was split into Best Pop Release and Best Dance Release. Another new category Best World Music Album was also presented for the first time. The ARIA Hall of Fame inducted: The Seekers.

Ceremony details

Presenters and performers 

The ARIA Awards ceremony was hosted by radio and TV personality Richard Stubbs. Presenters and performers were:

Dubious acceptance speech 

Itch-E and Scratch-E won the inaugural award for Best Dance Release. One of the duo, Paul Mac's acceptance speech included:

One of the sponsors of the ceremony was the National Drug Offensive, which withdrew their financial backing. The jargon term, ecstasy, for a psychoactive drug was bleeped for the TV broadcast. In 2005 Mac explained that he did not expect to win and so had no speech prepared.

Awards

Final nominees are shown, in plain, with winners in bold.

ARIA Awards
Album of the Year 
Tina Arena – Don't Ask
Christine Anu – Stylin' Up
The Cruel Sea – Three Legged Dog
Silverchair – Frogstomp
You Am I – Hi Fi Way
Single of the Year 
Silverchair – "Tomorrow"
Tina Arena – "Chains"
Merril Bainbridge – "Mouth"
Nick Cave and the Bad Seeds – "Do You Love Me?"
Max Sharam – "Coma"
Highest Selling Album 
The 12th Man – Wired World of Sports II
Tina Arena – Don't Ask
The Badloves – Get On Board
The Cruel Sea – Three Legged Dog
Wendy Matthews – The Witness Tree
Highest Selling Single 
Silverchair – "Tomorrow"
Merril Bainbridge – "Mouth"
Chocolate Starfish – "Mountain"
Kulcha – "Shaka Jam"
Kylie Minogue – "Confide in Me"
Best Group
The Cruel Sea – Three Legged Dog
Nick Cave and the Bad Seeds – Let Love In
Crowded House – "Private Universe"
Silverchair – Frogstomp
You Am I – Hi Fi Way
Best Female Artist 
Tina Arena – Don't Ask
Christine Anu – Stylin' Up
Merril Bainbridge – "Mouth"
Kylie Minogue – Kylie Minogue
Max Sharam – A Million Year Girl
Best Male Artist
Diesel – Solid State Rhyme
Paul Kelly – Wanted Man
Ed Kuepper – Character Assassination
Rick Price – River of Love
Chris Wilson – Live at the Continental
Best New Talent 
Silverchair – Frogstomp
Merril Bainbridge – "Mouth"
Magic Dirt – Life Was Better
Max Sharam – A Million Year Girl
The Truth – "My Heavy Friend"
Breakthrough Artist – Album
Silverchair – Frogstomp
Christine Anu – Stylin' Up
D.I.G. – Dig Deeper
Max Sharam – A Million Year Girl
Vika and Linda – Vika and Linda
Breakthrough Artist – Single
Silverchair – "Tomorrow"
Merril Bainbridge – "Mouth"
Directions In Groove – "The Favourite"
Max Sharam – "Coma"
Vika and Linda – "When Will You Fall for Me?"
Best Dance Release 
Itch-E and Scratch-E – "Sweetness and Light"
Boxcar – "What Are You So Happy About"
Quench – "Dreams"
Renegade Funktrain – "I Wonder"
The Rockmelons – "Stronger Together"
Single Gun Theory – Flow, River Of My Soul
Best Pop Release 
Tina Arena – "Chains"
Merril Bainbridge – "Mouth"
Kulcha – KulchaMental As Anything – Mr Natural
Tlot Tlot – "The Girlfriend Song"
Best Country Album Troy Cassar-Daley – Beyond the DancingSlim Dusty – Natural High
Gina Jeffreys – The Flame
Lee Kernaghan – Country Crowd
Jane Saunders – Strangers to Your Heart
Best Independent Release TISM – Machiavelli and the Four SeasonsDef FX – Ritual Eternal
Ed Kuepper – Character Assassination
Magic Dirt – Life Was Better
Single Gun Theory – Flow, River of My Soul
Best Alternative Release You Am I – Hi Fi WayCustard – Wahooti Fandango
Magic Dirt – Life Was Better
Regurgitator – Regurgitator
Silverchair – Frogstomp
Best Indigenous Release Christine Anu – Stylin' UpKev Carmody – "On the Wire"
Ruby Hunter – Thoughts Within
Tiddas – "Changing Times"
Yothu Yindi & Neil Finn – "Dots on the Shells"
Best Adult Contemporary Album My Friend the Chocolate Cake – BroodThe Black Sorrows – Lucky Charm
Phil Emmanuel & Tommy Emmanuel – Terra Firma
Dave Hole – Steel on Steel
Wendy Matthews – The Witness Tree
Best Comedy Release The 12th Man – Wired World of Sports IIAusten Tayshus – Alive and Schticking
Jimeoin – Crack
Kevin Bloody Wilson – Let Loose Live in London
Scared Weird Little Guys – Scared

Fine Arts Awards
Best Jazz Album Bernie McGann Trio – McGann McGannMark Simmonds Freeboppers – FireThe Allan Browne Quartet – Birdcalls
Australian Art Orchestra – Ringing the Ball Backwards
Bobby Gebert Trio – Sculpture
Best Classical Album Yvonne Kenny, Melbourne Symphony Orchestra, Vladimir Kamirski – Simple GiftsAdelaide Symphony Orchestra, David Porcelijn, János Fürst – Powerhouse Three Poems of Byron – Capriccio Nocturnes Unchained Melody
Duncan Gifford – Debussy Preludes Books I & II
Slava Grigoryan – Spirit of Spain
Graham Pushee, Australian Brandenburg Orchestra, Paul Dyer – Handel: Opera Arias
Best Children's Album The Wiggles – Big Red CarAdelaide Symphony Orchestra – Dream Child
Cinderella Acappella – Cinderella Acappella
Franciscus Henri – I'm Hans Christian Andersen
Play School – Oomba Baroomba
Best Original Soundtrack / Cast / Show Recording Cast Recording – The Pirates of PenzanceMartin Armiger – Fornicon
Guy Gross – The Priscilla Companion Original Score
Various – Heartland
Various – Metal Skin
Various – Once in a Blue Moon
Best World Music Album Yungchen Lhamo – Tibetan PrayerBu Baca Diop – Stand
The Celts – The Rocky Road
Nomad - Nomad
Sirocco – The Wetland Suite
Various – Tribal Heart

Artisan Awards
Song of the Year Tina Arena – "Chains" (Tina Arena)Merril Bainbridge – "Mouth" (Merril Bainbridge)
Daniel Johns/Ben Gillies – "Tomorrow" (Silverchair)
Neil Murray – "Island Home" (Christine Anu)
Max Sharam – "Coma" (Max Sharam)
Producer of the Year Note: User may be required to access archived information by selecting 'The History', then 'By Award', 'Producer of the Year' or 'Engineer of the Year' and 'Option Show Nominations'.Tony Cohen for The Cruel Sea – Three Legged DogDaniel Denholm
David Bridie
Paul McKercher
Phil McKellar
Engineer of the YearTony Cohen, Paul McKercher for The Cruel Sea – Three Legged DogDoug Brady
Cameron Craig
Mark Forrester
Craig Porteils
Doug Roberts
Best Video Keir McFarlane – Kylie Minogue – "Put Yourself in My Place"Robbie Douglas-Turner – You Am I – "Jewels & Bullets"
Bob Ellis – Electric Hippies – "Greedy People"
Paul Elliott – Max Sharam – "Coma"
Tony Mahoney – Dave Graney & the Coral Snakes – "I'm Gonna Release Your Soul"
Best Cover Art Dominic O'Brien – Max Sharam – A Million Year GirlSimon Anderson – Electric Hippies – The Electric Hippies
Simon Anderson – You Am I – Hi Fi Way
The Cruel Sea, Kristyna Higgins, Jim Paton – The Cruel Sea – Three Legged Dog
Reg Mombassa – Mental As Anything – Mr Natural

ARIA Hall of Fame inductee
The Hall of Fame inductee was:The Seekers'''

Notes

References

External links
ARIA Awards official website
List of 1995 winners

1995 music awards
1995 in Australian music
ARIA Music Awards